NGC 4464 is an elliptical galaxy located about 70 million light-years away in the constellation of Virgo. NGC 4464 was discovered by astronomer William Herschel on December 28, 1785. NGC 4464 is a member of the Virgo Cluster.

See also 
 List of NGC objects (4001–5000)

References

External links

Elliptical galaxies
Virgo (constellation)
4464
41148
7619
Astronomical objects discovered in 1785
Virgo Cluster